The 2022 World Athletics Championships was the eighteenth edition of the World Athletics Championships. It was held at Hayward Field in Eugene, Oregon, United States, from July 15–24, 2022, with the country hosting that competition for the first time. The competition was originally scheduled for August 6–15, 2021, but it was postponed by one year due to the COVID-19 pandemic.

After the 2022 Russian invasion of Ukraine, World Athletics banned all Russian and Belarusian athletes and officials from participating at the championships. In addition, the stringent vaccination requirements for people entering the United States caused visa delays for participants and officials, with some ultimately being unable to enter the country. These issues caused the final total to stand at 179 nations (180 including the Athlete Refugee Team), the lowest number since Tokyo 1991.

A record 29 countries won at least one gold medal during the championships. Peru, Kazakhstan, and Nigeria won their first-ever gold medals. India and Burkina Faso had their best medal performances, winning a silver, and the Philippines won a bronze. A new award was the team event trophy, which was won by the United States, which also won the most gold medals, with 13, and the most medals overall, with 33 (a record for a single edition). The event was the most-watched edition ever in US television history. More than 146,000 tickets were sold, with several evening sessions sold out.

There were four athletes who won two gold medals: Kimberly García in the Women's 20km Race Walk and the Women's 35km Race Walk; Michael Norman in the Men's 400m and the Men's 4x400m Relay; Sydney McLaughlin in the Women's 400m Hurdles and the Women's 4x400m Relay; and Abby Steiner in the Women's 4x100m Relay and Women's 4x400m Relay. In addition to the athletes who won two gold medals, Shelly-Ann Fraser-Pryce and Shericka Jackson both of Jamaica, earned 3 medals, 1 gold and 2 silvers in the Women's 100m (Fraser-Pryce gold; Jackson silver), the Women's 200 metres (Jackson gold; Fraser-Pryce silver) and the Women's 4x100m Relay (silver for both).

Three world records and 13 championship records were broken. The world records were set by Sydney McLaughlin, who ran 50.68 seconds in the Women's 400m Hurdles final; Tobi Amusan, who won the Women's 100m Hurdles semi-final in 12.12 seconds; and Armand Duplantis, who reached 6.21 meters in the Men's Pole Vault final.

Host selection and venue
The selection of the host city was announced on April 16, 2015 in Beijing, China. Eugene was selected without a traditional bidding process, though Eugene did put in a bid for the 2019 World Championships, losing out to Doha.

Runner's World magazine reported that Eugene's selection by World Athletics, then known as the International Association of Athletics Federations, was an "unusual move". They report the Association "bypassed the usual bidding process," and that the choice of Eugene would make the 2022 event "the first held in the United States." The event was the second held in North America, after Edmonton in 2001.

The Guardian reported that the lack of bidding triggered concern in European cities that had bid to host the event.
They quoted Lamine Diack, IAAF president, who justified the lack of bidding with the claim the selection of Eugene to host the event, "enables us to take advantage of a unique opportunity to host a financially successful tournament that may never arise again."

Despite this, the 2022 event was not the first to lack the usual bidding process: as the 2007 World Championships were awarded to Osaka without bidding after the withdrawal of the two other candidate cities.

Venue

The championships were held at the University of Oregon Hayward Field in Eugene, Oregon, which has 12,650 permanent seats and a temporary capacity of 25,000.  The venue had previously hosted the 2020 USA Olympic Track and Field Trials, the 2021 and 2022 NCAA Division I Outdoor Track Field Championships and the 2022 USA Outdoor Track and Field Championships. 
The track, installed in 2021, was manufactured by Beynon Sports.

The race walking was held on a 1-km loop on Martin Luther King Jr. Boulevard, near Autzen Stadium, and the marathon race started from the same stadium, towards Pre's Trail and going to Springfield, Oregon and back.

Results

Men

Track 

* Indicates the athletes only competed in the preliminary heats and received medals

Field

Combined

Women

Track 

* Indicates the athletes only competed in the preliminary heats and received medals

Field

Combined

Mixed 

* Indicates the athletes only competed in the preliminary heats and received medals

World Team

Medal table

Placing table

Entry standards 
World Athletics announced that athletes would qualify by their World Athletics Rankings position, wild card (reigning world champion or 2021 Diamond League winner) or by achieving the entry standard.

To qualify as a Wild Card you had to be one of the following things:
 Reigning World Outdoor Champion
 Winner of the 2021 Diamond League
 By finishing position at designated competitions (Area competitions)
 Leader (as at closing date of the qualification period):
 IAAF Hammer Throw Challenge
 World Athletics Challenge - Race Walking
 World Athletics Challenge - Combined Events

Countries who had no male and/or no female athletes who had achieved the Entry Standard or considered as having achieved the entry standard (see above) or a qualified relay team, could enter one unqualified male athlete OR one unqualified female athlete in one event of the championships (except the road events and field events, combined events, 10,000 m and 3000 m steeplechase).

Target numbers 
At the end of the qualification period, the 2021 World Athletics Rankings were published. They were used to invite additional athletes to the World Championships where the target number of athletes had not been achieved for that event through other methods of qualification.

The maximum of three athletes per country in individual events was not affected by this rule. Member federations retained the right to confirm or reject athlete selections through this method.

Where the highest ranked athletes were from a country that already had three entrants for the event, or where member federations had rejected an entrant, the next highest ranked athlete became eligible for entry via the world rankings.

Area Champions
The following regulations shall applied for Automatic Qualification to the 2022 World Athletics Championships (not applicable for relays and marathon).
1. The Area Champion (in each individual event to be contested at the World Championships) automatically qualifies for the World Championships, irrespective of whether his performance has reached the Entry Standard. This does not apply to 10,000 m, 3000 m Steeplechase, Combined Events, Field Events and Road Events where the entry of the athlete will be subject to the approval of the Technical Delegates
2. The Area Champion shall be the one who has achieved the title either in 2020, 2021 or 2022
3. The Member Federation of the Area Champion will have the ultimate authority to enter the athlete or not, based on its own domestic standard or qualification system
4. If the Member Federation of the Area Champion enters the athlete, he will be considered as having achieved the Entry Standard
5. If the Area Champion, for whatever reason, is not entered, his quota will not be delegated to the second placed athlete and the normal entry rules and conditions apply
6. For those Area Championships that do not have certain events, the Area Associations can organize alternate Area-specific event Championships with conditions conforming to Area Championships Regulations. World Athletics shall be notified of such alternative Championships at least one month in advance of the events being held

Schedule

Participating nations

1,972 athletes from 192 member federations were scheduled to compete at the championships, but owing to vaccination requirements and resulting visa issues the final total was reduced to 179 nations (plus the Athlete Refugee Team) and more than 1,700 athletes, the lowest number since 1991 for the former and 2005 for the latter.

A record 29 countries won at least one gold medal during the championships. Peru, Kazakhstan, and Nigeria won their first-ever gold medals, while India and Burkina Faso had their best medal performances, with silver, and the Philippines with bronze.

 East Timor (1)

Prize money
There was a world record programme where if a world record was broken the athlete who broke it would get $100,000.

A total amount of $8,498,000 was also offered by World Athletics to finalists at Oregon 2022, of which $2 million has been ringfenced from the fines paid by the Russian Athletics Federation (for doping rules offenses).

The prize money is as follows:

Individual events
Gold: $70,000
Silver: $35,000
Bronze: $22,000
Fourth place: $16,000
Fifth place: $11,000
Sixth place: $7,000
Seventh place: $6,000
Eighth place: $5,000

Relays (per each team)
Gold: $80,000
Silver: $40,000
Bronze: $20,000
Fourth place: $16,000
Fifth place: $12,000
Sixth place: $8,000
Seventh place: $6,000
Eighth place: $4,000

Media coverage
The event was streamed live in some territories on the World Athletics YouTube and Facebook channels.

The event was the most watched World Athletics Championships in US television history, reaching an excess of 13.7 million viewers.

International broadcasters
Arena Sport: Bosnia, Croatia, Kosovo,North Macedonia, Montenegro, Serbia, Slovenia
beIN Sports: MENA Region
ESPN International: Latin America (except Brazil)
NBC Sports: Puerto Rico, US Virgin Islands and United States
Sportv: Brazil
SuperSport, TVMS: Pan Sub-Saharan Africa
TV Jamaica: Pan Caribbean
TyC Sports: Argentina, Bolivia, Chile, Colombia, Costa Rica, Ecuador, El Salvador, Guatemala, Honduras, Nicaragua, Panama, Paraguay, Peru, Uruguay, Venezuela (except Brazil)

National broadcasters 

Antigua and Barbuda: ABS
Australia: SBS
Austria: ORF
Bahamas: ZNS
Barbados: CBC
Belarus: BTRC
Belgium: RTBF, VRT
Botswana: BTV
Brazil: Sportv
Burkina Faso: RTB
Canada: CBC Sports
Cape Verde: TCV
Cayman Islands: TVJi
Chile: TVN
China: CCTV
Colombia: RTVC
Comoros: ORTC
Costa Rica: Tigo Sports
Croatia: HRT
Cuba: ICRT
Cyprus: CYCBC
Czech Republic: CT
Democratic Republic of Congo: RTNC
Denmark: TV2
Equador: Spring Media
Estonia: ERR
Eswatini: Eswatini TV
Ethiopia: EBC
Finland: YLE
France: FT
Gambia: GRTS
Germany: ARD, ZDF
Ghana: GTV
Greece: ERT
Grenada: GBN
Honduras: Spring Media
Hungary: MTVA
Iceland: RUV
India: Sony Pictures Sports Network
Indonesia: TVRI
Israel: The Sports Channel
Italy: RAI, Sky
Jamaica: Television Jamaica
Japan: TBS
Kenya: KBC
Latvia: LT
Liberia: LNTV
Lithuania: LRT
Madagascar: TVM
Malawi: MBC
Malaysia and Brunei: ASTRO
Mauritius: MBC
Mexico: Claro Sports
Morocco: SNRT
Namibia: NBC
Netherlands: NOS
New Zealand: Sky Network NZ
Nigeria: NTA Sports 24
Norway: NRK
Panama: Medcom
Peru: Spring Media
Poland: TVP
Portugal: RTP
Romania: TVR
Rwanda: RTV
Senegal: RTS
Seychelles: SBC
Slovenia: RTVS
South Africa: SABC
South Korea: Sky Sports
Spain: TVE
St Lucia: Winners TV
Sweden: SVT
Switzerland: SRG, SSR
Türkiye: TRT
Uganda: UBC
Ukraine: UA:PBC
United Kingdom: BBC Sport
Uruguay: VTV
Venezuela: Meridiano

Notes and references

External links
Statistics Handbook IAAF Media

2021
World Championships
Sports in Eugene, Oregon
International track and field competitions hosted by the United States
World Athletics Championships
World Athletics Championships
Track and field in Oregon
Athletics (track and field) events postponed due to the COVID-19 pandemic
Sports events affected by the 2022 Russian invasion of Ukraine